Achwa 2 Hydroelectric Power Station is a  hydroelectric power plant, in Uganda.

Location
The power station is located across the Achwa River, in Gulu District, Northern Uganda. The geographical coordinates of the powr station are  :03°07'46.0"N, 32°30'52.0"E (Latitude:3.129444; Longitude:32.514444).

Overview
This power station is one in a cascade of five power stations planned on the Achwa River totaling , with Achwa 2 being the first to be built. Achwa 2 is a run-of-the-river hydroelectricity project with planned annual output of 281 GWh.

Other infrastructure that will be constructed include  of service roads, a  road to connect the site to the Gulu-Kitgum Road and a camp for the construction workers.

Ownership and funding
The power station is owned and being developed by ARPE Limited. The cost of construction is budgeted at US$78,808,400, of which the African Development Bank lent US$14,330,754 and the remaining US$64,477,646 was borrowed from Delta and other sources. PAC SpA, an Italian construction company, is the EPC contractor for civil works and Voith, a German manufacturer has been contracted to supply the four turbines and associated electro-mechanical parts. The contract includes design, manufacturing, supply, transportation, erection, testing and commissioning of all supplied equipment.

The sources of funding for this project are as illustrated in the table below:

Completion
As of January 2020, the power station was fully constructed. However, only 12 megawatts of the capacity 42 megawatts available was being evacuated via a 33kV power line to Kitgum and Layibi, a suburb in the city of Gulu. The planned development involves construction of a 132kV high voltage transmission line by Uganda Electricity Transmission Company Limited (UETCL), to its substation in  Lira. However, disagreements over land compensation for the transmission line delayed construction. The majority of disagreements have been resolved and construction is expected to resume in 2020. The government of Uganda is expected to pay a capacity charge for the 30 megawatts of unused electricity, until the evacuation line is commissioned. 

In an interview given in March 2022, the managing director/CEO of Uganda Electricity Transmission Company Limited (UETCL), the government parastatal responsible for evacuating the power from this power station indicated that the 132kV evacuation line and associated substation are expected to be ready during the first quarter of 2023.

See also
 Achwa 1 Hydroelectric Power Station
 Achwa 3 Hydroelectric Power Station
 List of power stations in Uganda

References

External links
 Website of the Electricity Regulatory Authority
 Work has begun on the HPP2 Uganda Hydropower Plant As of 23 February 2018.
 Gulu Leaders Complain Over Delayed Transmission Lines As of 4 December 2018.
 Uganda Increases Power Generation With More Dams As of 22 January 2020.

Gulu District
Pader District
2020 establishments in Uganda
Hydroelectric power stations in Uganda